In mathematics, a Hopf algebra, H, is quasitriangular if there exists an invertible element, R, of  such that

,

,

R is called the R-matrix.

As a consequence of the properties of quasitriangularity, the R-matrix, R, is a solution of the Yang–Baxter equation (and so a module V of H can be used to determine quasi-invariants of braids, knots and links).  Also as a consequence of the properties of quasitriangularity, ; moreover 
One may further show that the
antipode S must be a linear isomorphism, and thus S2 is an automorphism.  In fact, S2 is given by conjugating by an invertible element:  where  (cf. Ribbon Hopf algebras).

It is possible to construct a quasitriangular Hopf algebra from a Hopf algebra and its dual, using the Drinfeld quantum double construction.

If the Hopf algebra H is quasitriangular, then the category of modules over H is braided with braiding
.

Twisting
The property of being a quasi-triangular Hopf algebra is preserved by twisting via an invertible element  such that  and satisfying the cocycle condition

Such a twist is known as an admissible (or Drinfeld) twist.

See also
 Quasi-triangular quasi-Hopf algebra
 Ribbon Hopf algebra

Notes

References 
 
 

Hopf algebras